Titi is a New World monkey in the genus Callicebus.

Titi may also refer to:

Animals
 Central American squirrel monkey, referred to as the "titi monkey" in Costa Rica
 Geoffroy's tamarin, referred to as "titi monkey" in Panama
 Māori name for the sooty shearwater (Puffinus griseus)

Plants
 Cliftonia monophylla, tree
 Cyrilla racemiflora, sole species in the flowering plant genus Cyrilla

Places
 Titi, Burundi, a village
 Titi, Republic of the Congo, a town
 Titi / Muttonbird Islands, New Zealand

People
 Titi or Tyti, ancient Egyptian queen
 Titi (footballer, born 1988), Brazilian football cente-back
 Titi (footballer, born 2002), Brazilian football defender
 Thierry Henry (born 1977), French footballer
 Titi Camara (born 1972), Guinean footballer
 Yityish "Titi" Aynaw, Israeli model
 Titi (singer), Senegalese singer Ndeye Fatou

Lists of people by nickname